Jurgen Ceder (born 1963) is a Belgian politician and a member of the N-VA. He was first elected as a member of the Belgian Senate in 1995 for the Vlaams Blok party.  In 2009, he became group leader in the senate for Vlaams Belang. In July 2012 he became a member of N-VA. Because he was associated with the 70-point plan drawn up with the Vlaams Blok party, it caused dissatisfaction among other prominent members of N-VA with some members calling on the party not to adopt him as a candidate.

Notes

1963 births
Living people
Members of the Belgian Federal Parliament
People from Aalst, Belgium
Vlaams Belang politicians
New Flemish Alliance politicians
21st-century Belgian politicians